Tarḫuntaradu (Luwian: "worshiper of Tarḫunt") was king of Arzawa during the first half of the 14th century BC. Under his rule, the Luwian kingdom of Arzawa managed to penetrate far into the territory of the Hittite Empire, then weakened by invasions of the Kaška peoples. Tarhantaradu occupied areas in the "Lower Land" (Lycaonia), and succeeded in penetrating as far as the Hittite city of Tuwanuwa. He negotiated with, and married a daughter of, the Egyptian pharaoh Amenhotep III, who acknowledged him as "Great King" - a title usually given to the Hittite ruler.

Literature 
Susanne Heinhold-Krahmer: Tarḫundaradu, Tarḫun(n)aradu. In: Michael P. Streck (ed.): Reallexikon der Assyriologie und Vorderasiatischen Archäologie ["Real lexicon of Assyriology and Near Eastern Archeology"]. Vol. 13, Walter de Gruyter, Berlin/Boston 2011-2013, pp. 459-460.

References

Kings of Arzawa